Hibana velox (formerly also known as Aysha velox), often called the yellow ghost spider, is a common spider of North America. It can be found in foliage and in houses. It is useful in preying on insects like the citrus leafminer, Phyllocnistis citrella (Gracillariidae).

References
 Becker, L. (1879). Diagnoses de nouvelles aranéides américaines. Ann. Soc. ent. Belg. 22:77-86.
 Amalin, D.M., Reiskind, J., McSorley, R. & Peña, J. (1999). Survival of the hunting spider, Hibana velox (Araneae, Anyphaenidae), raised on different artificial diets. Journal of Arachnology 27:692-696. PDF
 Amalin, D.M., Peña, J.E., Yu, S., & McSorley, R. (2000). Selective toxicity of some pesticides to Hibana velox (Araneae: Anyphaenidae), a predator of citrus leafminer. Florida Entomologist 83:254-262.

External links

Anyphaenidae
Spiders of North America
Spiders described in 1879